Mycoplasma genitalium (MG, commonly known as Mgen) is a sexually transmitted, small and pathogenic bacterium that lives on the mucous epithelial cells of the urinary and genital tracts in humans. Medical reports published in 2007 and 2015 state that Mgen is becoming increasingly common. Resistance to multiple antibiotics is becoming prevalent, including to azithromycin, which until recently was the most reliable treatment. The bacteria was first isolated from the urogenital tract of humans in 1981, and was eventually identified as a new species of Mycoplasma in 1983. It can cause negative health effects in men and women. It also increases the risk factor for HIV spread with higher occurrences in those previously treated with the azithromycin antibiotics.

Specifically, it causes urethritis in both men and women, and also cervicitis and pelvic inflammation in women. It presents clinically similar symptoms to that of Chlamydia trachomatis infection and has shown higher incidence rates, compared to both Chlamydia trachomatis and Neisseria gonorrhoeae infections in some populations. Its complete genome sequence was published in 1995 (size 0.58 Mbp, with 475 genes). It was regarded as a cellular unit with the smallest genome size (in Mbp) until 2003 when a new species of Archaea, namely Nanoarchaeum equitans, was sequenced (0.49 Mbp, with 540 genes). However, Mgen still has the smallest genome of any known (naturally occurring) self-replicating organism and thus is often the organism of choice in minimal genome research.

The synthetic genome of Mgen named Mycoplasma genitalium JCVI-1.0 (after the research centre, J. Craig Venter Institute, where it was synthesised) was produced in 2008, becoming the first organism with a synthetic genome.

Signs and symptoms
Infection with Mgen produces a combination of clinical symptoms, but can be asymptomatic. It causes inflammation in the urethra (urethritis) both in men and women, which is associated with mucopurulent discharge in the urinary tract, and burning while urinating. In women, it causes cervicitis and pelvic inflammatory diseases (PID), including endometritis and salpingitis. Women may also experience bleeding after sex and it is also linked with tubal factor infertility. For men, the most common signs are painful urination or a watery discharge from the penis. Polymerase chain reaction analyses indicated that it is a cause of acute non-gonococcal urethritis (NGU) and probably chronic NGU. It is strongly associated with persistent and recurring non-gonococcal urethritis (NGU) responsible for 15 percent to 20 percent of symptomatic NGU cases in men. Unlike other Mycoplasma, the infection is not associated with bacterial vaginosis. It is highly associated with the intensity of HIV infection. Some scientists are performing research to determine if Mgen could play a role in the development of prostate and ovarian cancers and lymphomas in some individuals. These studies have yet to find conclusive evidence to suggest a link.

Genome
The genome of M. genitalium consists of 525 genes in one circular DNA of 580,070 base pairs. Scott N. Peterson and his team at the University of North Carolina at Chapel Hill reported the first genetic map using pulsed-field gel electrophoresis in 1991. They performed an initial study of the genome using random sequencing in 1993, by which they found 100,993 nucleotides and 390 protein-coding genes. Collaborating with researchers at The Institute for Genomic Research (TIGR; now the J. Craig Venter Institute), which included Craig Venter, they made the complete genome sequence in 1995 using shotgun sequencing. Only 470 predicted coding regions (out of 482 protein encoding genes) were identified, including genes required for DNA replication, transcription and translation, DNA repair, cellular transport, and energy metabolism. It was the second complete bacterial genome ever sequenced, after Haemophilus influenzae. In 2006, the team at the J. Craig Venter Institute reported that only 382 genes are essential for biological functions. The small genome of M. genitalium made it the organism of choice in The Minimal Genome Project, a study to find the smallest set of genetic material necessary to sustain life.

Pathophysiology
There is a consistent association of M. genitalium infection and female reproductive tract syndromes. M. genitalium infection was significantly associated with increased risk of preterm birth, spontaneous abortion, cervicitis, and pelvic inflammatory disease. In addition, this pathogen may latently infect the chorionic villi tissues of pregnant women, thereby impacting pregnancy outcome. Infertility risk is also strongly associated with infection with M. genitalium, although evidence suggests it is not associated with male infertility. When M. genitalium is a co-infectious agent risk associations are stronger and statistically significant. M. genitalium is strongly associated with HIV-1.

Diagnosis
Recent research shows that prevalence of Mgen is currently higher than other commonly occurring sexually transmitted infections (STIs). Mgen is a fastidious organism with prolonged growth durations. This makes detection of the pathogen in clinical specimens and subsequent isolation extremely difficult. Lacking a cell wall, mycoplasma remains unaffected by commonly used antibiotics. The absence of specific serological assays leaves nucleic acid amplification tests (NAAT) as the only viable option for detection of Mgen DNA or RNA. However, samples with positive NAAT for the pathogen should be tested for macrolide resistance mutations, which are strongly correlated to azithromycin treatment failures, owing to rapid rates of mutation of the pathogen. Mutations in the 23S rRNA gene of Mgen have been linked with clinical treatment failure and high level in vitro macrolide resistance. Macrolide resistance mediating mutations have been observed in 20-50% of cases in the UK, Denmark, Sweden, Australia, and Japan. Resistance is also developing towards the second-line antimicrobials like fluoroquinolone.

According to the European guidelines, the indication for commencement of diagnosis for Mgen infection are:

 Detection of nucleic acid (DNA and/or RNA) specific for Mgen in a clinical specimen
 Current partners of individuals who tested positive for Mgen should be treated with the same antimicrobial as the index patient
 If current partner does not attend for evaluation and testing, treatment with the same regimen as given to the index patient should be offered on epidemiological grounds
 On epidemiological grounds for sexual contacts in the previous 3 months; ideally, specimens for a Mgen NAAT should be collected before treatment and treatment should not be given before the result are available

Screening for Mgen with a combination of detection and macrolide resistance mutations will provide the adequate information required to develop personalised antimicrobial treatments, in order to optimise patient management and control the spread of antimicrobial resistance (AMR).

Detection of resistance
Owing to the widespread macrolide resistance, samples that are positive for Mgen should ideally be followed up with an assay capable of detecting mutations that mediate antimicrobial resistance. The European Guideline on Mgen infections, in 2016, recommended complementing the molecular detection of Mgen with an assay capable of detecting macrolide resistance-associated mutations.

Treatment
The U.S. Centers for Disease Control and Prevention recommends a step-wise treatment approach for Mycoplasma genitalium with doxycycline for 7 days followed immediately by a 7-day course of moxifloxacin as the preferred therapy due to high rates of macrolide resistance. If resistance assay testing is available, and the Mgen is sensitive to macrolides, the CDC recommends a 7-day course of doxycycline followed by a 4-day course of azithromycin.  Although the majority of M. genitalium strains are sensitive to moxifloxacin, resistance has been reported, and potential for serious, adverse side effects should be considered with this regimen.  Floroquinolones, including Moxifloxacin, have been associated with disabling and potentially irreversible serious adverse reactions that have occurred together including:
 Tendinitis and tendon rupture
 Peripheral Neuropathy
 Central nervous system effects

and other serious side effects detailed in the FDA black box warning. Moxifloxacin/Avelox should be reserved for use when patients have no other treatment options. 

In settings without access to resistance testing, or if Moxifloxacin cannot be used, the CDC recommends as an alternative regimen: 7 days of doxycycline followed by the 4-day course of azithromycin, with a test of cure 21 days after treatment being required due to the high rate of macrolide resistance.  Beta lactam antibiotics are not effective against Mgen as the organism lacks a cell wall.

In the UK the British Association for Sexual Health and HIV (BASHH) guidelines for treatment are:
 Doxycycline 100mg twice a day for seven days followed by azithromycin 1 gram orally as a single dose then 500mg orally once daily for 2 days where organism is known to be macrolide-sensitive or where resistance status is unknown.
 Moxifloxacin 400mg orally once daily for 10 days if organism known to be macrolide-resistant or where treatment with azithromycin has failed.

Treatment of Mycoplasma genitalium infections is becoming increasingly difficult due to rapidly growing antimicrobial resistance. Diagnosis and treatment is further hampered by the fact that Mycoplasma genitalium infections are not routinely tested. Studies have demonstrated that a 5-day course of azithromycin has a superior cure rate compared to a single, larger dose. Further, a single dose of azithromycin can lead to the bacteria becoming resistant to azithromycin. Among Swedish patients, doxycycline was shown to be relatively ineffective (with a cure rate of 48% for women and 38% for men); and treatment with a single dose of azithromycin is not prescribed due to it inducing antimicrobial resistance. The five-day treatment with azithromycin showed no development of antimicrobial resistance. Based on these findings, UK doctors are moving to the 5-day azithromycin regimen. Doxycycline is also still used, and moxifloxacin is used as a second-line treatment in case doxycyline and azithromycin are not able to eradicate the infection.
In patients where doxycycline, azithromycin and moxifloxacin all failed, pristinamycin has been shown to still be able to eradicate the infection.

History
Mycoplasma genitalium was originally isolated in 1980 from urethral specimens of two male patients with non-gonococcal urethritis in the genitourinary medicine (GUM) clinic at St Mary's Hospital, Paddington, London. It was reported in 1981 by a team led by Joseph G. Tully. Under electron microscopy, it appears as a flask-shaped cell with a narrow terminal portion that is crucial for its attachment to the host cell surfaces. The bacterial cell is slightly elongated somewhat like a vase, and measures 0.6–0.7 μm in length, 0.3–0.4 μm at the broadest region, and 0.06–0.08 μm at the tip. The base is broad while the tip is stretched into a narrow neck, which terminates with a cap. The terminal region has a specialised region called nap, which is absent in other Mycoplasma. Serological tests indicated that the bacterium was not related to known species of Mycoplasma. The comparison of genome sequences with other urinogenital bacteria, such as M. hominis and Ureaplasma parvum, revealed that M. genitalium is significantly different, especially in the energy-generating pathways, although it shared a core genome of ~250 protein-encoding genes.

Synthetic genome
On 6 October 2007, Craig Venter announced that a team of scientists led by Nobel laureate Hamilton Smith at the J. Craig Venter Institute had successfully constructed synthetic DNA with which they planned to make the first synthetic genome. Reporting in The Guardian, Venter said that they had stitched together a DNA strand containing 381 genes, consisting of 580,000 base pairs, based on the genome of M. genitalium. On 24 January 2008, they announced the successful creation of a synthetic bacterium, which they named Mycoplasma genitalium JCVI-1.0 (the name of the strain indicating J. Craig Venter Institute with its specimen number). They synthesised and assembled the complete 582,970-base pair genome of the bacterium. The final stages of synthesis involved cloning the DNA into the bacterium E. coli for nucleotide production and sequencing. This produced large fragments of approximately 144,000 base pairs or 1/4th of the whole genome. Finally, the products were cloned inside the yeast Saccharomyces cerevisiae to synthesize the 580,000 base pairs. The molecular size of the synthetic bacterial genome is 360,110 kilodaltons (kDa). Printed in 10-point font, the letters of the genome cover 147 pages.

On 20 July 2012, Stanford University and the J. Craig Venter Institute announced successful simulation of the complete life cycle of a Mycoplasma genitalium cell, in the journal Cell. The entire organism is modeled in terms of its molecular components, integrating all cellular processes into a single model. Using object oriented programming to model the interactions of 28 categories of molecules, including DNA, RNA, proteins, and metabolites, and running on a 128 computer Linux cluster, the simulation takes 10 hours for a single M. genitalium cell to divide once—about the same time the actual cell takes—and generates half a gigabyte of data.

Research
The discovery of Protein M, a new protein from M. genitalium, was announced in February 2014. The protein was identified during investigations on the origin of multiple myeloma, a B-cell hematologic neoplasm. To understand the long-term Mycoplasma infection, it was found that antibodies from multiple myeloma patients' blood were recognised by M. genitalium. The antibody reactivity was due to a protein never known before, and is chemically responsive to all types of human and nonhuman antibodies available. The protein is about 50 kDa in size, and composed of 556 amino acids.

References

External links
 Mycoplasma genitalium Reference Work at the UK Health Protection Agency
 Type strain of Mycoplasma genitalium at BacDive - the Bacterial Diversity Metadatabase

genitalium
Model organisms
Organism size
Sexually transmitted diseases and infections
Synthetic biology
Bacteria described in 1983
Pathogenic bacteria
Infectious causes of cancer